The Nandi Award for Best Film Critic winners since 1995:

References

Film Critic on Telugu Cinema